Stena Livia is a roll-on/roll-off (Ro/Ro) ferry operated by Stena Line on their Travemünde–Liepaja service. It was built in 2008, and originally named Norman Voyager.

Norman Voyager
The ship was built in 2008 by Cantiere Navale Visentini, Italy for Epic Shipping Ltd.  She was chartered to LD Lines in 2008 and named Norman Voyager. She made her maiden voyage between Rosslare and Le Havre on 6 November 2008, when LD Lines operated a Rosslare – Le Havre service in competition with Celtic Link Ferries operating between Rosslare and Cherbourg.  In 2009 she was chartered to Celtic Link Ferries to replace the Diplomat, first operating between Rosslare, Cherbourg and Portsmouth, and before switching to the Rosslare–Cherbourg route at the end of 2009.  She was chartered back to LD Lines in 2011 where she was re-registered in Le Havre, and operated between Marseille and Tunis.

In December 2009 she was involved in the rescue of three fishermen following the MV Alam Pintar and FV Etoile des Ondes collision. A report stated  "The conduct of the rescue was safe, efficient and in the best traditions of the merchant navy."  Later in 2011 she moved to the Portsmouth – Le Havre route.

In 2012 she was sold to Stena Line; from February 2013 to March 2014 she was operated by DFDS Seaways between Portsmouth and Le Havre.

Étretat

From 11 March 2014, Norman Voyager was chartered to Brittany Ferries, renamed Étretat (for a town in Normandy) and branded for their "économie" service. She continued to serve Portsmouth to Le Havre on Tuesday to Friday. She also ran a weekly return crossing from Portsmouth to Santander on Saturday/Sunday.

Étretat had 13 designated pet-friendly cabins, in addition to 88 standard 4-berth inside and outside cabins, and 51 reserved lounge seats (to Le Havre) or 20 (to Santander).

During winter 2014–2015, she ran a weekly return crossing from Portsmouth to Bilbao to cover this service, normally run by MV Cap Finistère, which was laid up to allow the installation of extra scrubbers. She also ran a weekly freight-only service between Portsmouth and Le Havre on Friday.

Stena Livia
On 9 April 2021, Stena Line announced that Étretat was to become the latest addition to their Baltic Sea fleet, renamed Stena Livia.

References

External links

 Official Stena Line Website

Ferries of the Republic of Ireland
Ferries of France
Ships built by Cantiere Navale Visentini
Ships built in Italy
2008 ships